Kaufman Geist (February 5, 1895 – April 21, 1948) was an American track and field athlete who competed in the 1920 Summer Olympics. In 1920 he finished twelfth in the triple jump competition.

References

External links
list of American athletes

1895 births
1948 deaths
American male triple jumpers
Olympic track and field athletes of the United States
Athletes (track and field) at the 1920 Summer Olympics